A number of mountains are called Sonnblick:

 Sonnblick–Böseck Group, a subdivision of the Goldberg Group
 Hoher Sonnblick, or Rauriser Sonnblick
 Großer Sonnblick or Malteiner Sonnblick, in the Ankogel Group
 Mittlerer Sonnblick, a sub-peak
 Stubacher Sonnblick in the Granatspitze Group

See also
Hoher Sonnblick Observatory, of the Central Institution for Meteorology and Geodynamics

Lists of mountains of the Alps